The 2013 season was the eleventh for the  Specialized–lululemon cycling team, which began as the T-Mobile team in 2003. Three riders joined the team in 2013, American cyclists Carmen Small and Tayler Wiles, and the Canadian Gillian Carleton. Charlotte Becker, Emilia Fahlin, Chloe Hosking, Clara Hughes and Amber Neben left the team in the post-Olympic year. The year was marked with a crash of Ina-Yoko Teutenberg at the Drenste 8 in March. She was unable to ride for the remainder of the season and ended her career afterwards. Ellen van Dijk became the leader of the team and had a great season. She won the general classification of a stage race four times as well as several one-day races and finished four times on the podium in World Cup races. Above all she won the World Time Trial Championships. Van Dijk finished 3rd in the final World Cup standings and also 3rd in the UCI World Ranking. Evelyn Stevens had to miss the Tour of Flanders due to a fall. She finished fifth in the Giro Rosa, third in the Route de France, with the American Team and finished behind teammates Ellen van Dijk and Carmen Small (3rd place), fourth in the time trial at the World Championships. She finished ultimately 7th in the UCI world Ranking.
The team was, like last year, undefeated in the team time trials and won the World Team Time Trial Championships in September. The team finished 3rd in the UCI World Ranking.

Roster

As of 1 January 2013. Ages as of 1 January 2013.

Source

Riders who joined the team for the 2013 season

Riders who left the team during or after the 2012 season

Season

January
In early January, Trixi Worrack won the German national cyclo-cross championships.

February – April: Classic races
February and March were two great months for Ellen van Dijk. After finishing third in the Ladies Tour of Qatar she won the first prestigious road victory of the season, Le Samyn des Samyn at the end of February. She escaped from the bunch with 35 km to go and finished three minutes ahead of the chasing group. In early March, during the Ronde van Drenthe, she went on a breakaway with Marianne Vos. Van Dijk lost the side by side sprint and finished second. In the second World Cup race the Trofeo Alfredo Binda, she finished again on the podium, this time in third place.  Finally, in late March, she finished second in the Tour of Flanders behind Marianne Vos again. Vos, Emma Johansson and Elisa Longo Borghine escaped on the Karemont, but Van Dijk was able to close the gap. Finally, the four women sprinted for victory. Ellen regretted that she was not able to outsprint Vos.

In March, at the Drenste 8 Ina-Yoko Teutenberg had a serious crash. She has a concussion and was not able to start in the spring classics. She did not recover as fast as she hoped and decided in June not to start anymore the season because she was not able to train in a proper way. 
Evelyn Stevens was not able to defend her title at the Flèche Wallonne due to a fall at the Classica Citta di Padova. She had broken teeth and numerous wounds. Ellen van Dijk finished sixth. Katie Colclough escaped in the final but was pulled back.

April – May: Stage races
Ellen van Dijk won begin April, the general classification of the Energiewacht Tour. She won the individual time trial stage over 21.1 km and finished twice second in a stages. The Gracia-Orlová was also really successful for the team at the end of April. Van Dijk won the general classification again together with the points classification, the prologue, stage 2 and stage 3. The other two stages were won by her teammates Evelyn Stevens (stage 3) and Loren Rowney (stage 5).

On 20 May, Carmen Small won Chrono Gatineau, and five days later the American time trial championship.

June – July: national championships and stage races 
In June, Evelyn Stevens returned in the peloton. She won the Philadelphia Cycling Classic, and later on a stage and the final classification of the  Giro del Trentino Alto Adige

At the end of the month the national championships took place and the team won three titles. Ellen van Dijk won the Dutch national time trial title, Lisa Brennauer won the German time trial title and Trixi Worrack the German road race title. Therefore, the team started the Giro Rosa with big ambitions. Evelyn Stevens, the leader of the team, was in the general classification in second place after the fourth stage, but finished tenth in the fifth stage and lost 3' 55" to Abbott. The day afterwards she finished in fifth place and lost 1'  32". On the final day Ellen van Dijk won the time trial stage. Stevens finished behind Van Dijk second and finished in fifth place overall. The Giro was won in the end by Mara Abbott.

In July, in the  Thüringen Rundfahrt der Frauen, Carmen Small won the sprint of the second stage. In the fourth stage, an individual time trial, Ellen van Dijk finished second behind Shara Gillow. Lisa Brennauer finished second in the last stage and third in the general classification.

August: Route de France and Sweden 

The second grand tour started at 3 August: La Route de France.  did not start in this race, but two riders were part of the American national team, Evelyn Stevens and Ally Stacher. Stevens finished fifth in the prologue. After six stages won by Giorgia Bronzini in the sprints, the last stage was disputed. Stevens attacked  in a difficult ascent, Linda Villumsen, former rider of the team between 2007 and 2010, chased her down and extended her lead. She finished with a lead of over 5 minutes and won also the general classification. Stevens was caught by the chasing group and with the difference made in the prologue she finished in third place.

At the Open de Suède Vårgårda TTT world cup race the team showed once again its supremacy in the team time trial. In the Open de Suède Vårgårda road race, there was a front group of 10 riders with Evelyn Stevens and Ellen van Dijk. After an attack by Marianne Vos, there were only six riders left with the two from Specialized–lululemon. Stevens went all out in the final kilometres, but was pulled back. Van Dijk finished fourth after a great team effort and Stevens finished sixth.

In the Lotto–Belisol Belgium Tour the team won the inaugural team time trial. Lisa Brennauer finished second in the third stage. Ellen van Dijk finished third in the last stage uphill in Geraardsbergen and ensured her third stage race victory of the season, with Brennauer finishing in second place.

September: Road World Championships

The Boels Rental Ladies Tour took place in early September. Trixi Worrack finished third in the first stage. After the team won the team time trial of the second stage, Worrack took the overall lead and kept the leading jersey until the last stage. After a hectic last stage, it was Ellen van Dijk, who was in second place four seconds behind Worrack, who won the stage race. Worrack finished ultimately in sixth place.

The Giro della Toscana Int. Femminile, renamed this year as the "pre worlds" because of the World Championships taking place in Tuscany, did not bring notable results for the team. The composition of the team was: Trixi Worrack, Ellen van Dijk, Evelyn Stevens, Carmen Small, Katie Colclough and Lisa Brennauer. They expressed great joy after winning. The team was, as in 2012, undefeated in the team time trial in the 2013 season.

Thereafter, the team members joined their respective national selection. In the individual time trial, Ellen van Dijk won the world title. She said upon arrival that it is a dream come true and that it is the result of a conscientious preparation with numerous reconnaissances of the course. She filmed the course to watch it over and over to know it by heart and to know the bends. In the same event, Small won the bronze medal, Steven finished fourth only 4 hundredths of a second from Small, Trixi Worrack finished fifth and Lisa Brennauer eleventh.

In the road race, Stevens was the only member of the team who was in the front group with the main favourites and finished fifth.

Results

Season victories

Results in major races

Single day races
At the 2013 UCI Women's Road World Cup, Ellen van Dijk finished 3rd in the final classification and Evelyn Stevens 10th. The team finished 3rd in the teams standing.

Grand Tours

UCI World Ranking

The team finished second in the UCI ranking for teams. The teams Orica–AIS, Specialized–lululemon and  finished close from each other with respectively 2138.5, 2132 and 2118.75 points.

References

2013 UCI Women's Teams seasons
2013 in American sports
2013 in women's road cycling
Velocio–SRAM Pro Cycling